David Bennett (born December 2, 1961) is an American high school athletics administrator and former football coach. He is athletic director for Lexington School District 1 in Lexington, South Carolina, a position he has held since 2017. Bennett served as the head football coach at Catawba College from 1995 to 2001 and at Coastal Carolina University from 2003 to 2011.

Playing career and education
Bennett played football and golf at Presbyterian College. He earned his bachelor's degree in history and social studies from Presbyterian in 1984. He added a master's degree in guidance and counseling from Clemson University.

Coaching career

Coastal Carolina
Bennett was hired on December 21, 2001 as the Chanticleers' first head coach prior to the football program's launch season in 2003. Bennett led the Chanticleers to a victory in their inaugural game, September 6, 2003, with a 21–14 home win over the Newberry Wolves. On December 9, 2011, Bennett was relieved of his duties after the program slumped to a 29–28 record over his final five seasons. In nine years, Bennett's teams produced a 63–39 record playing at the NCAA Division I FCS level.

Head coaching record

College

High school

References

1961 births
Living people
Catawba Indians football coaches
Clemson Tigers football coaches
Coastal Carolina Chanticleers football coaches
Newberry Wolves football coaches
Presbyterian Blue Hose football coaches
Presbyterian Blue Hose football players
Presbyterian Blue Hose men's golfers
High school football coaches in South Carolina
Clemson University alumni
People from Greer, South Carolina
Coaches of American football from South Carolina
Players of American football from South Carolina
Golfers from South Carolina